The dusky-capped flycatcher (Myiarchus tuberculifer) is a passerine bird in the tyrant flycatcher family. It breeds in forest and other woodland from southern Arizona, as well as the Chisos Mountains, Texas, south to northern Argentina and on Trinidad. It is resident in most of its range, but American breeders retreat to Mexico in winter.

The upperparts are brown, with a blackish head and short crest. The breast is grey and the belly is bright yellow. The brown tail feathers and wings have paler outer webs. The sexes are similar, but young birds have rufous edgings to the wings and tail.

The dusky-capped flycatcher is best separated from other confusingly similar Myiarchus species by its smaller size, blackish head, and its call, a sorrowful, descending, whistled  or wheeeeeu.

This species is insectivorous and catches its prey by flycatching amongst the middle branches of trees. Fruits such as from gumbo-limbo (Bursera simaruba), and less frequently from Cymbopetalum mayanum (Annonaceae) are sometimes also eaten, particularly in winter. The nest is built in a tree cavity, and the normal clutch is three brown-marked buff eggs. The young fledge 13 days after hatching.

References

Further reading

External links

 
 
 
 

dusky-capped flycatcher
Birds of Central America
Birds of South America
dusky-capped flycatcher